Mohamed Mohsen may refer to:

 Mohamed Mohsen (footballer) (born 1990), Egyptian footballer
 Mohamed Mohsen (Producer) (born 1989), Egyptian Producer